Himanen is a Finnish surname. Notable people with the surname include:

Hannu Himanen (born 1951), Finnish diplomat
Kairi Himanen (born 1992), Estonian footballer
Pekka Himanen (born 1973), Finnish philosopher

Finnish-language surnames
Surnames of Finnish origin